The 2005–06 Major Indoor Soccer League season was the fifth season for the league.  The regular season started on November 6, 2005, and ended on April 9, 2006.

League standings

Playoffs

Scoring leaders
GP = Games Played, G = Goals, A = Assists, Pts = Points

Source:

League awards
 Most Valuable Player: Adauto Neto, Baltimore
 Defender of the Year: Genoni Martinez, St. Louis
 Rookie of the Year: Vicente Figueroa, California
 Goalkeeper of the Year: Brett Phillips, St. Louis
 Coach of the Year: Omid Namazi, St. Louis
 Championship Series Finals MVP: Machel Millwood, Baltimore

Sources:

All-MISL Teams

First Team

Second Team

Source:

All-Rookie Team

Source:

References

External links
Major Indoor Soccer League II (RSSSF)

Major Indoor Soccer League (2001–2008)
2005 in American soccer leagues
2006 in American soccer leagues
2005–06